Nahum or Nehunyon was a Jewish Exilarch of the 2nd century AD according to the Seder Olam Zutta residing within the Parthian Empire. He is believed to be one of the oldest identifiable members of the house of the Exilarch in Babylonia as no explicit mention to one is noted before him tenure. Very little is known about him or about the nature of the office that he served during his own lifetime. He was allegedly succeeded as Exilarch by his brother, Johanan.

See also
Exilarch
Seder Olam Zutta
List of Babylonian Exilarchs

External links
Jewish Encyclopedia- Exilarch
 Genealogy of the House of David- Nahum, 2nd Exilarch

References

Exilarchs
2nd-century Jews
Jewish royalty